Ron (or Ronald) Klein (or Klain, Kline, Clyne) may refer to:

 Ron Klain (born 1961), White House Chief of Staff since 2021
 Ron Klein (born 1957), American lawyer and former Florida politician
 Ron Kline (1932–2002), American baseball player
 Ronald Kline (born 1941), American judge investigated by Bradley Willman
 Ronald Clyne (1925–2006), Canadian graphic designer